"Kiss & Love" is a 2014 charity song and a single with lyrics by Lionel Florence and music by Pascal Obispo. Around 120 artists from France and other French-speaking countries took part in the song and the music videos. All revenues from the sale of the record go into Sidaction, a major French public event that started in 1994 in France for raising awareness and collecting charitable funds for AIDS. It donates important sums to various AIDS charities, HIV/AIDS research, institutions specializing in medical care and social aid for those suffering of HIV/AIDS in France and internationally.

The 2014 Sidaction project was under the direction of Pascal Obispo, being the 20th anniversary of the Sidaction association that was established in 1994.

The title track "Kiss & Love" is the only original song arranged by Brice Davoli with artistic contributions by Alain Souchon, Julien Clerc, Jean-Jacques Goldman, Francis Cabrel et Françoise Hardy and others. The other twenty tracks in the same-titled album are interpreted by various French-language artists in duos, trios etc.

Artists in the song
Here is a listing of the around 120 artists taking part in the single:.

Alizée
Amandine Bourgeois
Amaury Vassili
Amel Bent
Anggun
Anthony Kavanagh
Arnaud Ducret
Arthur
Ary Abittan
Baptiste Giabiconi
Brice Conrad
Camille Lou
Christophe Dechavanne
Claudia Tagbo
Collectif Métissé
Corson
Cyril Hanouna
Damien Sargue
David Carreira
Djénéva
Dumè
Élie Semoun
Élisa Tovati
Féfé
Florence Foresti
Florent Mothe
Florent Peyre
Franck Dubosc
Frédéric Lerner
Frédéric Lopez
Gad Elmaleh
Helmut Fritz
Jean-Luc Reichmann
Jeff Panacloc
Judith
Keen'V
Kenza Farah
Kev Adams
La Fouine
Laurent Ruquier
Leslie
Louis Delort
Louisy Joseph
Maître Gims
M. Pokora
Matt Houston
Mutine (Duo Manon & Silvio)
Mathieu Madénian
Maude
Merwan Rim
Michaël Gregorio
Michaël Youn
Mickaël Miro
Mikelangelo Loconte
Mimie Mathy
Muriel Robin
Nazim
Nicolas Canteloup
Nikos Aliagas
Nolwenn Leroy
Olympe
Pascal Obispo
Patrick Bosso
Pauline
Roberto Bellarosa
Romain Ughetto
Sébastien Cauet
Sexion d'Assaut
Shy'm
Sofia Essaïdi
Sonia Lacen
Stanislas
Stéphane Bern
Tal
Thierry Amiel
Titoff
Tony Saint Laurent
Vincent Niclo
Vitaa
Ycare
Yoann Fréget

Charts

References

2014 singles
2014 songs
Charity singles
Songs written by Lionel Florence
Songs with music by Pascal Obispo
Warner Music France singles